Karin Page is an Australian singer-songwriter and multi-instrumentalist. Karin won the Star Maker award at the 2016 Country Music Awards of Australia.

Originally from Western Australia, Page moved to Byron Bay, New South Wales in 2016.

Early life and career
Page attended Perth Modern School on a music scholarship before graduating in contemporary music from the Western Australian Academy of Performing Arts. She formed and fronted the band Spoonful of Sugar which was then renamed China Doll. In 2014 Page toured and played with her partner Adam Nyeholt. In 2016 Page released two singles. "Keep On" and "Wherever You Are" both of which have received substantial airplay on radio stations all over Australia.

Discography

Albums

Awards and nominations

WAM Song of the Year
The WAM Song of the Year was formed by the  Western Australian Rock Music Industry Association Inc. (WARMIA) in 1985, with its main aim to develop and run annual awards recognising achievements within the music industry in Western Australia.

 (wins only)
|-
| 2020
| "Take Me Down"
| Country Song of the Year
| 
|-

References

External links
Official website

Living people
Australian country singers
Australian women singers
People from Western Australia
Year of birth missing (living people)